Tommy Lee James is an American country music songwriter and record producer with Still Working Music Group. Based in Nashville, Tennessee, he is originally from Roanoke, Virginia.

He graduated from Northside High School then attended Radford University, where he studied voice. He moved to Nashville with dreams of becoming an artist, but then became a full-time songwriter.

James is the writer of a number of hit songs, including Reba McEntire's "And Still", Brooks & Dunn's "A Man This Lonely", Reba McEntire and Brooks & Dunn's duet "If You See Him/If You See Her", Martina McBride's "Wrong Again", Cyndi Thomson's "What I Really Meant to Say", and Tim McGraw's "She's My Kind of Rain". All these songs went to number one on the charts.

James had an additional chart topping success with "I Wish" recorded by Jo Dee Messina and "Let's Be Us Again" recorded by Lonestar which was a top 4 hit. He also co-wrote the critically acclaimed single by Gary Allan entitled "Life Ain't Always Beautiful".

James has had many other cuts with artists such as Cliff Richard, 98 Degrees, Pam Tillis, Blue County, Emerson Drive, Jedd Hughes, Little Big Town, Delta Goodrem, and Pussycat Dolls.

In addition to being a writer, James also produced albums for Capitol Records recording artists Cyndi Thomson, Susan Ashton and Emily West, Big Machine artist Danielle Peck, and former Lonestar vocalist Richie McDonald.

James' success continues in 2012 with Joe Walsh's new album, Analog Man, which was released on June 5, 2012 (co-produced by Jeff Lynne), and One Direction's new record, Take Me Home.

Writing credits

References

External links
Interview with Tommy Lee James
Apple Music Playlist
Music Row
BMI - She's My Kind Of Rain
BMI - My Eyes

Living people
American country songwriters
American male songwriters
Radford University alumni
Year of birth missing (living people)